Adargunchi is a suburb in the southern state of Karnataka, India. It is located in the Hubli taluk of Dharwad district in Karnataka.

Demographics 
As of the 2011 Census of India there were 1,559 households in Adargunchi and a total population of 7,625 consisting of 3,837 males and 3,788 females. There were 967 children ages 0-6.

Noted people
 Shanta Hublikar - Legendary actress in Marathi and Hindi cinema in 1940s, was born in Adargunchi village.

See also 
 Dharwad
 Districts of Karnataka

References

External links 
 Dharwad website

Villages in Dharwad district